Sporobolus maritimus, or synonymously as Spartina maritima, the small cordgrass, is a species of cordgrass native to the coasts of western and southern Europe and western Africa, from the Netherlands west across southern England to southern Ireland, and south along the Atlantic coast to Morocco and also on the Mediterranean Sea coasts. There is also a disjunct population on the Atlantic coasts of Namibia and South Africa.

Description
Sporobolus maritimus is a coarse, robust, herbaceous perennial plant growing gregariously from a creeping rootstock. The pointed stem tip does not overtop the highest spikelet. The flowers are greenish, turning yellowish-brown by the winter.

Distribution and habitat
Sporobolus maritimus is native to the west-facing coasts of Europe and North Africa. It occupies a range of habitats including very soft mud and shingle, in minimally exposed areas, away from strong wave action. It occurs on the seaward margins of saltmarshes and creeks and may be plentiful in dried up pools in the upper parts of saltmarshes. In the British Isles, it occurs in estuaries in Essex and in the Solent.

Hybridisation and decline
When the related American species Sporobolus alterniflorus (smooth cordgrass) was introduced to southern England in about 1870, it hybridised with S. maritimus to give the hybrid Sporobolus × townsendii. This then gave rise to a new allotetraploid species Sporobolus anglicus (common cordgrass), which is much more vigorous, and has now largely ousted S. maritimus from much of its native range in Western Europe.

References

UK Joint Nature Conservation Committee: Spartina
English Nature: Spartina summary

maritima
maritimus